Nick Trask (born 6 February 1978) is a former Australian rules footballer who played with the Brisbane Lions in the Australian Football League (AFL).

Trask played for the Eastern Ranges in the TAC Cup and also at Vermont, before being drafted to the AFL.

Selected with pick 28 in the 1995 AFL draft, Trask played four games midway through the season and was then recalled for Brisbane's qualifying final at Waverley Park.

He appeared in the seniors a further seven times in 1997 before being delisted.

References

External links
 
 

1978 births
Brisbane Lions players
Living people
Australian rules footballers from Victoria (Australia)
Eastern Ranges players